The Copa 2013 MX Clausura was the 69th staging of the Copa MX, the 42nd staging in the professional era and is the second tournament played since the 1996–97 edition.

This tournament started on January 15, 2013 and concluded on April 10, 2013.

Participants Clausura 2013

This tournament will feature all the clubs from the Liga MX, excluding those that will participate in the 2012-13 CONCACAF Champions League (Santos, Tigres, Monterrey and Guadalajara), and the 3 that will participate in the Copa Libertadores 2013 (León, Tijuana and Toluca) and the best 13 teams from the Ascenso MX, excluding Leones Negros and Pumas Morelos.

List of teams

Tiebreakers

If two or more clubs are equal on points on completion of the group matches, the following criteria are applied to determine the rankings:

 superior goal difference;
 higher number of goals scored;
 scores of the group matches played among the clubs in question;
 higher number of goals scored away in the group matches played among the clubs in question;
 best position in the Relegation table;
 fair play ranking;
 drawing of lots.

Group stage

Every group is composed by four clubs, two from Liga MX and two from Ascenso MX. Instead of a traditional robin-round schedule, the clubs will play in three two-legged "rounds", the last one being contested by clubs of the same league.

Each win gives a club 3 points, each draw gives 1 point. An extra point is awarded for every round won; a round is won by aggregated score, and if it is a tie, the extra point will be awarded to the team with higher number of goals scored away.

All times are UTC-05:00

Group 1

Clubs from Liga MX: América 
Clubs from Ascenso MX: Necaxa, Neza and Altamira 
Broadcaster: TDN

Round 1

Necaxa won the round 4-0 on aggregated score

América won the round 5-1 on aggregated score

Round 2

Neza won the round 4-1 on aggregated score

América won the round 7-2 on aggregated score

Round 3

Necaxa won the round 4-2 on aggregated score

America won the round 5-4 on aggregated score

Group 2

Clubs from Liga MX: Morelia and Querétaro 
Clubs from Ascenso MX: Veracruz and Estudiantes Tecos 
Broadcaster: TVC Deportes

Round 1

Quéretaro won the round 3-2 on aggregated score

Veracruz won the round 3-2 on aggregated score

Round 2

Estudiantes won the round 4-2 on aggregated score

Round 3

Estudiantes Tecos won the round 4-1 on aggregated score

2-2 on aggregated score

Group 3

Clubs from Liga MX: Cruz Azul and Atlas 
Clubs from Ascenso MX: Lobos BUAP and Irapuato 
Broadcaster: ESPN

Round 1

Cruz Azul won the round 3-0 on aggregated score

Atlas won the round 4-2 on aggregated score

Round 2

Atlas won the round 2-0 on aggregated score

Cruz Azul won the round 2-1 on aggregated score

Round 3

Irapuato won the round 5-1 on aggregated score

Atlas won the round 4-3 on aggregated score

Group 4

Clubs from Liga MX: UNAM and Puebla 
Clubs from Ascenso MX: Mérida and Celaya 
Broadcaster: SKY and TDN

Round 1

UNAM won the round 5-1 on aggregated score

Puebla won the round 8-1 on aggregated score

Round 2

3-3 on aggregated score

Puebla won the round 3-1 on aggregated score

Round 3

Merida won the round 6-5 on aggregated score

UNAM won the round 4-1 on aggregated score

Group 5

Clubs from Liga MX: Chiapas and San Luis
Clubs from Ascenso MX: La Piedad and Cruz Azul Hidalgo 
Broadcaster: SKY and TDN

Round 2

Cruz Azul Hidalgo won the round 5-2 on aggregated score

San Luis won the round 6-2 on aggregated score

Round 1

Round 3

Group 6

Clubs from Liga MX: Pachuca and Atlante
Clubs from Ascenso MX: Dorados and Correcaminos
Broadcaster: TVC Deportes

Round 1

Atlante won the round 3-2 on aggregated score

Pachuca won the round 5-2 on aggregated score

Round 2

Pachuca won the round 6-5 on aggregated score

Atlante won the round 5-0 on aggregated score

Round 3

Ranking of runners-up clubs

The best two runners-up advances to the Championship Stage. If two or more teams are equal on points on completion of the group matches, the following criteria are applied to determine the rankings:

 superior goal difference;
 higher number of goals scored;
 higher number of goals scored away;
 best position in the Relegation table;
 fair play ranking;
 drawing of lots.

Championship Stage

The eight clubs that advance to this stage will be ranked and seeded 1 to 8. In case of ties, the same tiebreakers used to rank the runners-up will be used.

In this stage, all the rounds will be one-off game. If the game ends in a tie, there will proceed to penalty shootouts directly.
The venue will be determined as follows:

If both clubs are from the same league, the highest seeded club will host the match.
If both clubs are from different leagues, the club from Ascenso MX will host the match.

Liguilla Bracket

Goalscorers
8 goals
 Narciso Mina (América)

7 goals
 Matías Alustiza (Puebla)

4 goals
 Alberto García (Atlante)
 Jerónimo Amione (Atlante)
 Ezequiel Orozco (Necaxa)

3 goals

 Juan Cuevas (San Luis)
 Pablo Hütt (Cruz Azul Hidalgo)
 Daniel Ludueña (Pachuca)
 Fernando Cavenaghi (Pachuca)
 Antonio López Ojeda (América)
 Luis Arroyo (Neza)
 Luis García Sanz (Pumas)
 Jahir Barraza (Atlas)
 Teófilo Gutiérrez (Cruz Azul)

2 goals

 Cristian Felipe Ocaña Téllez (Veracruz)
 Luis Alonso Sandoval (Atlas)
 Yasser Corona (San Luis)
 Jorge Ocampo (Celaya)
 Raúl Meraz (Pachuca)
 Alfonso Nieto (Pumas)
 Gustavo A. Ramírez Rojas (Dorados)
 Marvin Leonardo Piñón (Altamira)
 Eder Pacheco (Correcaminos)
 Roberto Ruiz Esparza Jr. (Merida)
 Ariel González (Irapuato)
 Damián Zamogilny (Irapuato)
 Diego Martiñones (Tecos)
 Christian Mejía (Tecos)
 Ricardo Antonio Jiménez (Correcaminos)
 Francisco Fonseca (Atlante)
 Iván Salvador Estrella Guerrero (Celaya)
 Eduardo Lillingston (Tecos)
 Isaac Romo (Puebla)

1 goal

 Luis Omar Hernández (Necaxa)
 Rubén Wbías (Cruz Azul Hidalgo)
 Luis Loroña (Chiapas)
 Diego Castellanos (Chiapas)
 Maximiliano Pérez (Necaxa)
 Mariano Trujillo (Chiapas)
 Martín Galván (Cruz Azul Hidalgo)
 Mariano Pavone (Cruz Azul)
 Elio Castro Guadarrama (Dorados)
 Álvaro Ortiz (San Luis)
 Óscar Emilio Rojas (La Piedad)
 Marco Iván Pérez (San Luis)
   Pablo Antonio Gabas (Queretaro)
 Luis Nieves (Tecos)
 Jorge Arturo Echavarría Alemán (Queretaro)
 Addiel Reyes (Merida)
 Fernando Navarro Morán (Pachuca)
 Héctor Mancilla (Morelia)
 Luis Fernando Télles González (Atlas)
 Osvaldo Martínez (America)
 Enrique Esqueda (Pachuca)
 Félix Borja (Puebla)
 Segundo Castillo (Puebla)
 Luis Miguel Noriega (Puebla)
 Jesús Isijara (Necaxa)
 Reiji Sato (Morelia)
 Alfonso Rippa (Querétaro)
 Martín Eduardo Zúñiga (América)
 Eduardo Gallegos (Correcaminos)
 Miguel Ángel Herrera (Pachuca)
 Jorge Aparicio (La Piedad)
 Alberto Medina (Puebla)
 Carlos Emilio Orrantía (Pumas)
 Efraín Velarde (Pumas)
 Javier Aquino (Cruz Azul)
 Eduardo Herrera (Pumas)
 Claudio Ernesto González Muñoz (Atlante)
 Orlindo Ayoví (Irapuato)
 Mauro Matos (San Luis)
 Robin Ramírez (Pumas)
 Jorge Zárate (Chiapas)
 Héctor Acevedo (Cruz Azul Hidalgo)
 Gregorio Torres (Atlas)
 Edson Rivera (Atlas)
 Agustín Enrique Herrera (Altamira)
 Emilio García (Pachuca)
 Víctor Mañon (Pachuca)
 Omar Marrufo (Veracruz)
 Héctor Gómez (Queretaro)
 Miguel Layún (América)
 Rubens Sambueza (América)
 Michel García (Necaxa)
 Juan Pablo Alfaro (Tecos)
 Christian Valdez (Morelia)
 Eduardo Mendoza Herrera (Neza)
 José Rodolfo Reyes (Neza)
 Alberto Lucio (Neza)
 Hibert Ruiz (Morelia)
 Héctor Velázquez (Dorados)
 Rodolfo Pizarro (Pachuca)
 Simón Almeida (Pachuca)
 Javier Güemez (Dorados)
 Gil Cordero (América)
 Tomás Quiñones (Cruz Azul Hidalgo)
 Jaime Lozano (Pumas)
 Abraham Riestra (Celaya)
 Julio Pardini (Celaya)
 Diego Alberto Cervantes (Querétaro)
 Allam Bello (Cruz Azul)
 Rolando González (Estudiantes de Altamira)
 Lugiani Gallardo (Necaxa)
 Daniel Quintero Huitrón (Tecos)
 Cuauhtémoc Blanco (Dorados)
 Rodrigo Ruiz (Tecos)
 Ventura Alvarado (America)
 Danny Santoya (Necaxa)
 Mitchel Oviedo (Querétaro)
 Francisco Torres (Morelia)
 Edson Silva (San Luis)
 Mario Padilla (Dorados)
 Fernando Sinecio González Torres (La Piedad)
 Jorge Alberto Urias Gaxiola (América)
 Emanuel Loeschbor (Neza)
 Marco Gómez (Mérida)
 Guillermo Clemens (Celaya)
 Dante Garay (Mérida)
 Marco Reyna (Celaya)
 Gustavo Guillen (Irapuato)
 Martín Bravo (Pumas)
 Ángel Sepúlveda (Neza)
 Adolfo Domínguez Gerardo (Dorados)
 Natividad Carrasco (Dorados)
 Alejandro Molina (Correcaminos)
 Íñigo Rey (Irapuato)
 Dudu Paraiba (Lobos BUAP)
 Bardo Issac Fierros Ruiz (Mérida)
 Rodrigo Noya (Mérida)
 Tomás Charles (Mérida)
 José Leonardo Cuevas (Celaya)
 Carlos Gutiérrez Armas (Atlas)
 Vicente Matías Vuoso (Atlas)
 Jhon Córdoba (Chiapas)
 Alan Mendoza (Pumas)
 Jorge Mora (Cruz Azul Hidalgo)
 Emmanuel Sánchez (La Piedad)
 Darío Carreño (Pachuca)
 Esteban Paredes (Atlante)
 Christian Giménez (Cruz Azul)

Own goals
  Sanitago Morandi (Altamira) (For America)
  Jonathan Lozano (Morelia) (For Veracruz)
  Guillermo Christhofer Martín Torres (Atlas) (For Irapuato)
  Pierre Ibarra (Lobos BUAP) (For Cruz Azul)
  Rodrigo Godinez (Morelia) (For Tecos)
  Hervey Meza (Pachuca) (For Dorados)
  Josue Perea (Irapuato) (For Cruz Azul)
  Daniel Quintero Huitrón (Tecos) (For Veracruz)
  Carlos Trejo (San Luis) (For Jaguares)

Broadcast

Four television networks have the broadcasting rights.

TVC Deportes: Group 2 and Group 6
TDN: Group 1, Group 4 (UNAM and Puebla) and Group 5 (San Luis and Cruz Azul Hidalgo)
ESPN Deportes: Group 3
SKY México: Group 4 (Mérida and Celaya) and Group 5 (Chiapas and La Piedad)

The broadcasting rights for the Championship Stage are shared between all the networks.

References

External links
 Official page of Copa MX (as well as Liga MX and Ascenso MX)

2013, 1
Copa Mx, 1
Copa Mx, 1
Copa Mx, 2